William Bradford Shockley Jr. (February 13, 1910 – August 12, 1989) was an American inventor and physicist. He was the manager of a research group at Bell Labs that included John Bardeen and Walter Brattain. The three scientists were jointly awarded the 1956 Nobel Prize in Physics for "their researches on semiconductors and their discovery of the transistor effect".

Partly as a result of Shockley's attempts to commercialize a new transistor design in the 1950s and 1960s, California's Silicon Valley became a hotbed of electronics innovation.

In his later life, while a professor of electrical engineering at Stanford University and afterward, Shockley became widely known for his racist views and advocacy of eugenics.

Early life and education
Shockley was born to American parents in London on February 13, 1910, and was raised in his family's hometown of Palo Alto, California, from the age of three. His father, William Hillman Shockley, was a mining engineer who speculated in mines for a living and spoke eight languages. His mother, May (née Bradford), grew up in the American West, graduated from Stanford University and became the first female U.S. Deputy mining surveyor. Shockley was homeschooled up to the age of eight, due to his parents' dislike of public schools as well as Shockley's habit of violent tantrums. Shockley learned some physics at a young age from a neighbor who was a Stanford physics professor. Shockley spent two years at Palo Alto Military Academy, then briefly enrolled in the Los Angeles Coaching School to study physics and later graduated from Hollywood High School in 1927.

Shockley earned his Bachelor of Science degree from Caltech in 1932 and a PhD from MIT in 1936. The title of his doctoral thesis was Electronic Bands in Sodium Chloride, a topic suggested by his thesis advisor, John C. Slater.

Career
Shockley was one of the first recruits to Bell Labs by Mervin Kelly, who became director of research at the company in 1936 and focused on hiring solid-state physicists. Shockley joined a group headed by Clinton Davisson in Murray Hill, New Jersey. Executives at Bell Labs had theorized that semiconductors may offer solid-state alternatives to the vacuum tubes used throughout Bell's nationwide telephone system. Shockley conceived a number of designs based on copper-oxide semiconductor materials, and with Walter Brattain unsuccessfully attempted to create a prototype in 1939.

Shockley published a number of fundamental papers on solid state physics in Physical Review. In 1938, he received his first patent, "Electron Discharge Device", on electron multipliers.

When World War II broke out, Shockley's prior research was interrupted and he became involved in radar research in Manhattan (New York City). In May 1942, he took leave from Bell Labs to become a research director at Columbia University's Anti-Submarine Warfare Operations Group. This involved devising methods for countering the tactics of submarines with improved convoying techniques, optimizing depth charge patterns, and so on. Shockley traveled frequently to the Pentagon and Washington to meet high-ranking officers and government officials.

In 1944, he organized a training program for B-29 bomber pilots to use new radar bomb sights. In late 1944 he took a three-month tour to bases around the world to assess the results. For this project, Secretary of War Robert Patterson awarded Shockley the Medal for Merit on October 17, 1946.

In July 1945, the War Department asked Shockley to prepare a report on the question of probable casualties from an invasion of the Japanese mainland. Shockley concluded:

This report influenced the decision of the United States to drop atomic bombs on Hiroshima and Nagasaki, which preceded the surrender of Japan.

Shockley was the first physicist to propose a log-normal distribution to model the creation process for scientific research papers.

Development of the transistor
Shortly after the war ended in 1945, Bell Labs formed a solid-state physics group, led by Shockley and chemist Stanley Morgan, which included John Bardeen, Walter Brattain, physicist Gerald Pearson, chemist Robert Gibney, electronics expert Hilbert Moore, and several technicians. Their assignment was to seek a solid-state alternative to fragile glass vacuum tube amplifiers. First attempts were based on Shockley's ideas about using an external electrical field on a semiconductor to affect its conductivity. These experiments failed every time in all sorts of configurations and materials. The group was at a standstill until Bardeen suggested a theory that invoked surface states that prevented the field from penetrating the semiconductor. The group changed its focus to study these surface states and they met almost daily to discuss the work. The rapport of the group was excellent, and ideas were freely exchanged.

By the winter of 1946 they had enough results that Bardeen submitted a paper on the surface states to Physical Review. Brattain started experiments to study the surface states through observations made while shining a bright light on the semiconductor's surface. This led to several more papers (one of them co-authored with Shockley), which estimated the density of the surface states to be more than enough to account for their failed experiments. The pace of the work picked up significantly when they started to surround point contacts between the semiconductor and the conducting wires with electrolytes. Moore built a circuit that allowed them to vary the frequency of the input signal easily. Finally they began to get some evidence of power amplification when Pearson, acting on a suggestion by Shockley, put a voltage on a droplet of glycol borate placed across a p–n junction.

Bell Labs' attorneys soon discovered Shockley's field effect principle had been anticipated and devices based on it patented in 1930 by Julius Lilienfeld, who filed his MESFET-like patent in Canada on October 22, 1925. Although the patent appeared "breakable" (it could not work) the patent attorneys based one of its four patent applications only on the Bardeen-Brattain point contact design. Three others (submitted first) covered the electrolyte-based transistors with Bardeen, Gibney and Brattain as the inventors.

Shockley's name was not on any of these patent applications. This angered Shockley, who thought his name should also be on the patents because the work was based on his field effect idea. He even made efforts to have the patent written only in his name, and told Bardeen and Brattain of his intentions.

Shockley, angered by not being included on the patent applications, secretly continued his own work to build a different sort of transistor based on junctions instead of point contacts; he expected this kind of design would be more likely to be commercially viable. The point contact transistor, he believed, would prove to be fragile and difficult to manufacture. Shockley was also dissatisfied with certain parts of the explanation for how the point contact transistor worked and conceived of the possibility of minority carrier injection.

On February 13, 1948, another team member, John N. Shive, built a point contact transistor with bronze contacts on the front and back of a thin wedge of germanium, proving that holes could diffuse through bulk germanium and not just along the surface as previously thought. Shive's invention sparked Shockley's invention of the junction transistor. A few months later he invented an entirely new, considerably more robust, type of transistor with a layer or 'sandwich' structure. This structure went on to be used for the vast majority of all transistors into the 1960s, and evolved into the bipolar junction transistor. Shockley later described the workings of the team as a "mixture of cooperation and competition". He also said that he kept some of his own work secret until his "hand was forced" by Shive's 1948 advance. Shockley worked out a rather complete description of what he called the "sandwich" transistor, and a first proof of principle was obtained on April 7, 1949.

Meanwhile, Shockley worked on his magnum opus, Electrons and Holes in Semiconductors which was published as a 558-page treatise in 1950. The tome included Shockley's critical ideas of drift and diffusion and the differential equations that govern the flow of electrons in solid state crystals. Shockley's diode equation is also described. This seminal work became the reference text for other scientists working to develop and improve new variants of the transistor and other devices based on semiconductors.

This resulted in his invention of the bipolar "junction transistor", which was announced at a press conference on July 4, 1951.

In 1951, he was elected to the National Academy of Sciences (NAS). He was forty-one years old; this was rather young for such an election. Two years later, he was chosen as the recipient of the prestigious Comstock Prize for Physics by the NAS, and was the recipient of many other awards and honors.

The ensuing publicity generated by the "invention of the transistor" often thrust Shockley to the fore, much to the chagrin of Bardeen and Brattain. Bell Labs management, however, consistently presented all three inventors as a team. Though Shockley would correct the record where reporters gave him sole credit for the invention, he eventually infuriated and alienated Bardeen and Brattain, and he essentially blocked the two from working on the junction transistor. Bardeen began pursuing a theory for superconductivity and left Bell Labs in 1951. Brattain refused to work with Shockley further and was assigned to another group. Neither Bardeen nor Brattain had much to do with the development of the transistor beyond the first year after its invention.

Shockley left Bell Labs around 1953 and took a job at Caltech.

Shockley, Bardeen and Brattain received the Nobel Prize in Physics in 1956.

Shockley Semiconductor

In 1956, Shockley started Shockley Semiconductor Laboratory in Mountain View, California, which was close to his elderly mother in Palo Alto, California. The company, a division of Beckman Instruments, Inc., was the first establishment working on silicon semiconductor devices in what came to be known as Silicon Valley.

Shockley recruited brilliant employees to his company, but alienated them by undermining them relentlessly. "He may have been the worst manager in the history of electronics", according to his biographer Joel Shurkin. Shockley was autocratic, domineering, erratic, hard-to-please, and increasingly paranoid. In one well-known incident, he demanded lie detector tests to find the "culprit" after a company secretary suffered a minor cut. In late 1957, eight of Shockley's best researchers, who would come to be known as the "traitorous eight", resigned after Shockley decided not to continue research into silicon-based semiconductors. They went on to form Fairchild Semiconductor, a loss from which Shockley Semiconductor never recovered and which led to its purchase by another company three years later. Over the course of the next 20 years, more than 65 new enterprises would end up having employee connections back to Fairchild.

A group of about thirty colleagues have met on and off since 1956 to reminisce about their time with Shockley as, the group's organizer said in 2002, "the man who brought silicon to Silicon Valley".

Views on race and eugenics

After Shockley left his role as director of Shockley Semiconductor, he joined Stanford University, where he was appointed the Alexander M. Poniatoff Professor of Engineering and Applied Science in 1963, a position which he held until he retired as a professor emeritus in 1975.

In the last two decades of his life, Shockley, who had no degree in genetics, became widely known for his extreme views on race and human intelligence, and his advocacy of eugenics. As described by his Los Angeles Times obituary, "He went from being a physicist with impeccable academic credentials to amateur geneticist, becoming a lightning rod whose views sparked campus demonstrations and a cascade of calumny." He thought his work was important to the future of humanity and he also described it as the most important aspect of his career. He argued that a higher rate of reproduction among purportedly less intelligent people was having a dysgenic effect, and argued that a drop in average intelligence would lead to a decline in civilization. He also claimed that black people were genetically and intellectually inferior to white people. (Shockley's biographer Joel Shurkin notes that for much of Shockley's life in the racially segregated United States of the time, he had almost no contact with black people.) In a debate with psychiatrist Frances Cress Welsing M.D. and on Firing Line with William F. Buckley Jr., Shockley argued, "My research leads me inescapably to the opinion that the major cause of the American Negro's intellectual and social deficits is hereditary and racially genetic in origin and, thus, not remediable to a major degree by practical improvements in the environment."

Shockley was one of the race theorists who received money from the Pioneer Fund, and at least one donation to him came from its founder, the eugenicist Wickliffe Draper. Shockley's writings and lectures were partly based on the writings of psychologist Cyril Burt. Shockley proposed that individuals with IQs below 100 should be paid to undergo voluntary sterilization. Anthropologist and far-right activist Roger Pearson defended Shockley in a self-published book co-authored with Shockley. In 1973, University of Wisconsin–Milwaukee professor Edgar G. Epps argued that "William Shockley's position lends itself to racist interpretations". The Southern Poverty Law Center describes Shockley as a white nationalist who failed to produce evidence for his eugenic theories amidst "near-universal acknowledgement that his work was that of a racist crank". The science writer Angela Saini describes Shockley as having been "a notorious racist".

Shockley's advocacy of eugenics triggered protests. In one incident, the science society Sigma Xi, fearing violence, canceled a 1968 convocation in Brooklyn where Shockley was scheduled to speak.

In Atlanta in 1981, Shockley filed a libel suit against the Atlanta Constitution after a science writer, Roger Witherspoon, compared Shockley's advocacy of a voluntary sterilization program to Nazi human experimentation. The suit took three years to go to trial. Shockley won the suit but he only received one dollar in damages and he did not receive any punitive damages. Shockley's biographer Joel Shurkin, a science writer on the staff of Stanford University during those years, sums this statement up by saying that it was defamatory, but Shockley's reputation was not worth much by the time the trial reached a verdict. Shockley taped his telephone conversations with reporters, transcribed them, and sent the transcripts to the reporters by registered mail. At one point, he toyed with the idea of making the reporters take a simple quiz on his work before he would discuss the subject matter of it with them. His habit of saving all of his papers (including laundry lists) provides abundant documentation on his life for researchers.

Shockley was a candidate for the Republican nomination in the 1982 United States Senate election in California. He ran on a single-issue platform of opposing the "dysgenic threat" that he alleged African-Americans and other groups posed. He came in eighth place in the primary, receiving 8,308 votes and 0.37% of the vote. According to Shurkin, by this time, "His racism destroyed his credibility. Almost no one wanted to be associated with him, and many of those who were willing did him more harm than good."

A 2019 study in the journal Intelligence found him to be the second-most controversial (behind Arthur Jensen) intelligence researcher among 55 persons covered.

Personal life
At age 23 and while still a student, Shockley married Jean Bailey in August 1933. The couple had two sons and a daughter. Shockley separated from her in 1953. He married Emily Lanning, a psychiatric nurse, in 1955; she helped him with some of his theories. Although one of his sons earned a PhD at Stanford University and his daughter graduated from Radcliffe College, Shockley believed his children "represent a very significant regression ... my first wife – their mother – had not as high an academic-achievement standing as I had."

Shockley was an accomplished rock climber, going often to the Shawangunks in the Hudson River Valley. His route across an overhang, known as "Shockley's Ceiling", is one of the classic climbing routes in the area. Several climbing guidebooks changed the route's name to "The Ceiling" in 2020 due to Shockley's eugenics controversies. He was popular as a speaker, lecturer, and amateur magician. He once "magically" produced a bouquet of roses at the end of his address before the American Physical Society. He was also known in his early years for elaborate practical jokes. He had a longtime hobby of raising ant colonies.

Shockley donated sperm to the Repository for Germinal Choice, a sperm bank founded by Robert Klark Graham in hopes of spreading humanity's best genes. The bank, called by the media the "Nobel Prize sperm bank", claimed to have three Nobel Prize-winning donors, though Shockley was the only one to publicly acknowledge his involvement. However, Shockley's controversial views brought the Repository for Germinal Choice a degree of notoriety and may have discouraged other Nobel Prize winners from donating sperm.

According to PBS, Shockley was cruel towards his children and unhappy in his life. He reportedly tried playing Russian roulette as part of an attempted suicide.

Death
Shockley died of prostate cancer in 1989 at the age of 79. At the time of his death, he was estranged from most of his friends and family, except his second wife, the former Emmy Lanning (1913–2007). His children reportedly learned of his death by reading his obituary in the newspaper. Shockley is interred at Alta Mesa Memorial Park in Palo Alto, California.

Honors
 National Medal of Merit, for his war work in 1946.
 Comstock Prize in Physics of the National Academy of Sciences in 1953.
 First recipient of the Oliver E. Buckley Solid State Physics Prize of the American Physical Society in 1953.
 Co-recipient of the Nobel Prize in physics in 1956, along with John Bardeen and Walter Brattain. In his Nobel lecture, he gave full credit to Brattain and Bardeen as the inventors of the point-contact transistor. 
 Holley Medal of the American Society of Mechanical Engineers in 1963.
 Wilhelm Exner Medal in 1963.
 Honorary science doctorates from the University of Pennsylvania, Rutgers University in New Jersey, and Gustavus Adolphus Colleges in Minnesota.
 IEEE Medal of Honor from the Institute of Electrical and Electronics Engineers (IEEE) in 1980.
 Named by Time magazine as one of the 100 most influential people of the 20th century.

Patents
Shockley was granted over ninety US patents. Some notable ones are:
  April 4, 1950; his first granted patent involving transistors.
  September 25, 1951; His earliest applied for (June 26, 1948) patent involving transistors.
  October 13, 1953; Used in computers.
  April 2, 1957; The diffusion process for implantation of impurities.
  April 24, 1962; Improvements on process for production of basic materials.
  September 11, 1962; Exploring other semiconductors.

Bibliography

Prewar scientific articles by Shockley

Postwar articles by Shockley
 
 
 
 
 
 "On the Statistics of Individual Variations of Productivity in Research Laboratories", Shockley 1957
 On heredity, dysgenics and social issues:
 Shockley 1965, "Is Quality of US Population Declining." U.S. News & World Report, November 22, pp. 68–71
 Shockley 1966, "Possible Transfer of Metallurgical and Astronomical Approaches to Problem of Environment versus Ethnic Heredity" (on an early form of admixture analysis)
 Shockley 1966, "Population Control or Eugenics." In J. D. Roslansky (ed.), Genetics and the Future of Man (New York: Appleton-Century-Crofts)
 Shockley 1967, "The Entrenched Dogmatism of Inverted Liberals", manuscript by Shockley from which major portions were read in lectures
 Shockley 1968, "Proposed Research to Reduce Racial Aspects of the Environment-Heredity Uncertainty", proposal read by Shockley before the National Academy of Science on April 24, 1968
 Shockley 1968, "Ten Point Position Statement on Human Quality Problems", revised by Shockley from a talk which he presented on "Human Quality Problems and Research Taboos" 
 Shockley 1969, "An Analysis Leading to a Recommendation Concerning Inquiry into Eugenic Legislation", press release by Shockley, Stanford University, April 28, 1969
 Shockley 1970, "A 'Try Simplest Cases' Approach to the Heredity-Poverty-Crime Problem." In V. L. Allen (ed.), Psychological Factors in Poverty (Chicago: Markham)
 Shockley 1979, "Proposed NAS Resolution, drafted October 17, 1970", proposed by Shockley before the National Academy of Sciences
 Shockley 1970, "New Methodology to Reduce the Environment-Heredity Uncertainty About Dysgenics"
 Shockley 1971, "Hardy-Weinberg Law Generalized to Estimate Hybrid Variance for Negro Populations and Reduce Racial Aspects of the Environment-Heredity Uncertainty"
 Shockley 1971, "Dysgenics – A Social Problem Evaded by the Illusion of Infinite Plasticity of Human Intelligence?", manuscript planned for reading at the American Psychological Association Symposium entitled: "Social Problems: Illusion, Delusion or Reality."
 "Models, Mathematics, and the Moral Obligation to Diagnose the Origin of Negro IQ Deficits", W. Shockley, (1971)  
 "Negro IQ Deficit: Failure of a 'Malicious Coincidence' Model Warrants New Research Proposals", Shockley 1971 
 "Dysgenics, Geneticity, Raceology: A Challenge to the Intellectual Responsibility of Educators", Shockley 1972a 
 "A Debate Challenge: Geneticity Is 80% for White Identical Twins' I.Q.'s", Shockley 1972b
 Shockley 1972, "Proposed Resolution Regarding the 80% Geneticity Estimate for Caucasian IQ", advance press release concerning a paper presented by Shockley
 Shockley 1973, "Deviations from Hardy-Weinberg Frequencies Caused by Assortative Mating in Hybrid Populations"
 Shockley 1974, "Eugenic, or Anti-Dysgenic, Thinking Exercises", press release by Shockley dated 1974 May 3
 Shockley 1974, "Society Has a Moral Obligation to Diagnose Tragic Racial IQ Deficits", prepared statement by Shockley to be read during his debate against Roy Innis
 Shockley 1978, "Has Intellectual Humanitarianism Gone Berserk?", introductory statement read by Shockley prior to a lecture given by him at UT Dallas
 Shockley 1979, "Anthropological Taboos About Determinations of Racial Mixes", press release by Shockley on October 16, 1979
 Shockley 1980, "Sperm Banks and Dark-Ages Dogmatism", position paper presented by Shockley in a lecture to the Rotary Club of Chico, California, April 16, 1980
 Shockley 1981, "Intelligence in Trouble", article by Shockley published in Leaders magazine, issue dated 1981 Jun 15

Books by Shockley
 Shockley, William – Electrons and holes in semiconductors, with applications to transistor electronics, Krieger (1956) 
 Shockley, William and Gong, Walter A – Mechanics Charles E. Merrill, Inc. (1966)
 Shockley, William and Pearson, Roger – Shockley on Eugenics and Race: The Application of Science to the Solution of Human Problems, Scott-Townsend (1992)

Interviews
 Interview of William Shockley by Lillian Hoddeson on 1974 Sep. 10, Niels Bohr Library & Archives, American Institute of Physics, College Park, MD USA
 Playboy 1980, William Shockley interview with Playboy

Notes

Other notes

References

External links

 National Academy of Sciences biography
  including his Nobel Lecture, December 11, 1956 Transistor Technology Evokes New Physics
 PBS biography
 Gordon Moore. Biography of William Shockley Time Magazine
 Interview with Shockley biographer Joel Shurkin
Oral history interview transcript for William Shockley on 10 September 1974, American Institute of Physics, Niels Bohr Library & Archives - interview conducted by Lillian Hoddeson in Murray Hill, New Jersey
 History of the transistor
 William Shockley (IEEE Global History Network)
 Shockley and Bardeen-Brattain patent disputes
 William Shockley vs. Francis Cress-Welsing (Tony Brown Show, 1974)

Guide to the William Shockley Papers SC0222

1910 births
1989 deaths
20th-century American businesspeople
20th-century American inventors
20th-century American physicists
American atheists
American eugenicists
American Nobel laureates
American technology chief executives
American technology company founders
Businesspeople from London
Businesspeople from New Jersey
California Institute of Technology alumni
California Republicans
Columbia University people
Deaths from cancer in California
Deaths from prostate cancer
Experimental physicists
Fellows of the American Physical Society
IEEE Medal of Honor recipients
Massachusetts Institute of Technology alumni
Members of the United States National Academy of Sciences
MIT Department of Physics alumni
Nobel laureates in Physics
Oliver E. Buckley Condensed Matter Prize winners
Quantum physicists
People from Hanover Township, New Jersey
People from Palo Alto, California
Proponents of scientific racism
Race and intelligence controversy
Science and technology in the San Francisco Bay Area
Scientists at Bell Labs
Scientists from California
Scientists at Shockley Semiconductor Laboratory
Semiconductor physicists
Silicon Valley people
Sperm donors
Stanford University Department of Electrical Engineering faculty
Stanford University School of Engineering faculty
Time Person of the Year
United States Army Science Board people